Deneen Zezell Graham Kerns (born 1964) is a dance teacher and pageant contestant from North Carolina. In 1983 she became the first African-American to win the Miss North Carolina beauty pageant; she remained the only African-American to have won the Miss North Carolina pageant until Alexandra Badgett was crowned in 2019.

Personal life
Graham was born in North Wilkesboro, North Carolina. Her parents, Jean and Bobby Graham, were both educators in Wilkes County public schools. She entered the 1983 Miss North Carolina pageant at 19, as Miss Elkin Valley. North Wilkesboro held a Deneen Graham Day two weeks after she received the Miss North Carolina title. Vanessa Williams, winner of the Miss America 1984 title, has said that the Ku Klux Klan threatened to burn a cross on Graham's lawn after she won the North Carolina pageant.

In 1986, she graduated from the North Carolina School of the Arts with a Bachelor of Fine Arts degree in Dance. She traveled to the Mediterranean, Far East, and Alaska with the Department of Defense Entertainment Tours, and toured the United States with the first national tour of the musical Heartstrings. She appeared in "Theatre of the Stars" productions of such musicals as Gentlemen Prefer Blondes, South Pacific, Hello, Dolly!, The Music Man, and The Will Rogers Follies. As a performer with the Miss Georgia pageant from 1988–94, she served as co-choreographer and chief choreographer. She was also a member of the Atlanta Hawks Dance Team (Cheerleaders) during the 1994 season; she served as the assistant to the dance team choreographer. She was inducted into the Wilkes County Hall of Fame in 2016.

She is a member of the Dance Masters of America. Many of her students at Carol Walker Dance Academy have received the highest awards in regional and national competitions, and the academy's dance team are currently (as of 2008) National Dance Champions.

Pageants
 Miss Georgia pageant performer
 Miss North Carolina 1983
 Participant in Miss America 1984 pageant

Dance

 Fine Arts degree
 Broadway shows
 Choreographers of performances on Broadway and Miss Georgia Organization pageants
 Atlanta Hawks Dance Team
 Artistic Director of Dancers Company One
 Member of Dance Masters of America
 Choreographed many productions on Broadway and television
 Appeared and choreographed, as lead dancer, in hundreds of movies

References

1964 births
Living people
African-American actresses
American actresses
African-American choreographers
American choreographers
African-American female dancers
African-American female models
African-American models
American cheerleaders
American female dancers
Dancers from North Carolina
Female models from North Carolina
Miss America 1980s delegates
Miss North Carolina winners
National Basketball Association cheerleaders
People from North Wilkesboro, North Carolina
University of North Carolina School of the Arts alumni
20th-century American people
20th-century African-American women
20th-century African-American people
21st-century African-American people
21st-century African-American women